Stephen James Randall,  is a  professor emeritus of History at the University of Calgary, former director of the University of Calgary's Latin America Research Centre and the Institute for United states Policy Research, author, academic, civil-right advocate, oil policy expert, and more recently a progressive political activist.

Academic
Randall has taught at the University of Toronto (1971-74), McGill University (1974-1989), the University of Calgary (1989-2013). He was a visiting professor at San Diego State University and held the Fulbright Chair in North American Studies at American University in Washington.  He held the Imperial Oil-Lincoln McKay Chair in american Studies at the University of Calgary, 1989-1996 and was the Dean, Faculty of Social Sciences 1994-2006. He was Director of the Institute for United States Policy Research and subsequently director of the Latin American Research Centre at the University of Calgary. Randall's scholarship has focused on Canada-United States relations, and inter-American relations with a particular focus on Colombia.

Personal
Randall was born in Toronto, Ontario in 1944. He and his wife, Dr. M. Anne Katzenberg, live in Charleswood Heights in Calgary, Alberta.

Human Rights, Civil Liberties
He was the first president of the Rocky Mountain Civil Liberties association. He has had the honour to work in international elections in Nicaragua, El Salvador, Venezuela, Jamaica and Cambodia with the United Nations, the Carter Presidential Centre and the Organization of American States. International observers and election workers have played important roles in ensuring that all citizens have had the opportunity to vote in free and open elections.

Honours
Randall is an elected member of the Royal Society of Canada; a fellow of the Canadian Council for the Americas and the Centre for Military and Security Studies at the University of Calgary.  He was honoured with the Award of Merit, Grand Cross and the Order of San Carlos by the government of Colombia for his contributions to an understanding of Colombian history and foreign policy.  He received a lifetime public service award from the Canadian Council for the Americas.

Political activism
On January 7, 2011, Randall was nominated as the Liberal Party of Canada candidate in Calgary Centre-North for the 41st Canadian federal election.

Electoral record

Selected publications 
John Herd Thompson; Stephen J Randall (1994) Canada and the United States : ambivalent allies, Athens : University of Georgia Press

References

External links
 Stephen Randall Campaign Website
 Stephen Randall at Canadian International Council
 Stephen Randall at Government of Canada
 Stephen Randall at Latin American Research Centre
 Stephen Randall at School of Public Policy, University of Calgary

Canadian political scientists
20th-century Canadian historians
Canadian male non-fiction writers
Academic staff of the University of Calgary
Candidates in the 2011 Canadian federal election
Living people
Fellows of the Royal Society of Canada
University of Toronto alumni
Academic staff of the University of Toronto
Writers from Toronto
Academic staff of McGill University
Liberal Party of Canada candidates for the Canadian House of Commons
Year of birth missing (living people)